Richard Boro (born 20 November 1996) is a Togolese professional footballer who plays as a midfielder for Ivorian club FC San Pédro.

Career
In January 2018, Boro moved to Wadi Degla SC in Egypt from Dynamic Togolais, signing a two and a half year contract. The following January, he signed with Tala'ea El Gaish SC, also in Egypt. He made his international debut for Togo in a friendly match against Egypt in March 2017.

References

External links

1996 births
Living people
Togolese footballers
Togolese expatriate footballers
Association football midfielders
Dynamic Togolais players
Wadi Degla SC players
Tala'ea El Gaish SC players
Egyptian Premier League players
Togolese expatriate sportspeople in Ivory Coast
Expatriate footballers in Iraq
Expatriate footballers in Ivory Coast
Togo international footballers
FC San-Pédro players
21st-century Togolese people